Maynard Electronics was an American company based in Lake Mary, Florida that produced magnetic tape data storage related products.

The company was founded by Kim and Alison Knapp in 1982.  It was acquired by Archive Corp. in 1989, but the brand was maintained.  In order to make it easier to sell tape drives, the company created driver software that came to be called MaynStream.  After Conner Peripherals acquired Archive, the software product was renamed Backup Exec.

External links 
 History of Backup Exec.

1982 establishments in Florida
1989 establishments in Florida
American companies established in 1982
American companies disestablished in 1989
Companies based in Seminole County, Florida
Computer companies established in 1982
Computer companies disestablished in 1989
Computer storage companies
Defunct companies based in Florida
Defunct computer companies of the United States
Manufacturing companies based in Florida